Jack Lancaster is a British composer, record producer and musician.

In the late 1960s, Lancaster co-founded the British rock group Blodwyn Pig with Jethro Tull guitarist Mick Abrahams and in the late 1970s he was a member of the British progressive rock group Aviator with former Jethro Tull drummer Clive Bunker, former Manfred Mann's Earth Band guitarist Mick Rogers, and former Caravan and Quantum Jump bassist John G. Perry that released two albums on the EMI America Records label (Lancaster appeared only on the band's debut). In between these high-profile projects, Lancaster collaborated with keyboardist Robin Lumley in the studio band The Soul Searchers with a line-up that included guitarists Gary Moore and John Goodsall, bassist Percy Jones, and drummer Bill Bruford. This group released one 7" single Scaramouche b/w Head Stand in 1975 for EMI Records.

Lancaster performed on two Jazz Fusion records with Lumley that were released by RSO Records in the mid-1970s. The first was The Rock Peter and the Wolf (1975), a rock version of Russian composer Sergei Prokofiev's Peter and the Wolf,  and the second was Marscape (1976); both albums featured the contributions of members of what would become Lumley's future band Brand X (John Goodsall, Percy Jones, and Phil Collins on drums).

In 1979, Lancaster and Dutch keyboardist Rick van der Linden released the electronic album Wild Connections on the Acrobat Records label that featured former Blue Mink drummer Barry Morgan and The English Chorale. 1980, Lancaster released a solo album on the Kamera Records label titled Skinningrove Bay that included Rod Argent, Clive Bunker, Phil Collins, Robin Lumley, Gary Moore, John G. Perry, Mick Rogers, Rick van der Linden and Bernie Frost.

Since then he has performed live on tour, composed for television and film, performed as a session musician and has produced, written and arranged recording sessions with artists including Gary Moore, Phil Collins, Rod Argent, Anthony Phillips, Hans Zimmer, Stéphane Grappelli, Brian Eno, The View, Vangelis and Rick van der Linden. Lancaster lives in Hollywood.

Discography

With Blodwyn Pig 
 1969: Ahead Rings Out
 1970: Getting to This
 1997: Live at The Lafayette 
 1997: The Modern Alchemist
 1999: On Air 
 1999: Live at the Fillmore West 
 2000: The Basement tapes 
 2002: Live At The Marquee Club London 1974 (The Official Bootleg)
 2004: Pigthology

Soul Searchers 
 1975: "Scaramouche" / "Head Stand" – Single

Aviator 
 1979 : Aviator

Solo recordings 
 1975: Peter & The Wolf – with Robin Lumley, Phil Collins, Bill Bruford, Stéphane Grappelli, Alvin Lee, Gary Moore, etc.
 1976: Marscape – with the musicians of Brand X – Robin Lumley, John Goodsall, Percy Jones & Phil Collins.
 1979: Wild Connections – with Rick van der Linden, with The English Chorale.
 1980: Skinningrove Bay – with Gary Moore, Phil Collins, Bernie Frost, John G. Perry, Clive Bunker, Mick Rogers, Rod Argent, Rick van der Linden, Robin Lumley, etc. (Re-released under the title Deep Green in 1991.)
 1995: The Deathray Tapes – with Mick Farren, Brad Dourif.
 2016: Carnival of the Animals – with Phil Collins, Rod Argent, Gary Brooker, John Kramer, Mick Abrahams, etc.

External links 
 Blodwyn Pig Discography: https://www.discogs.com/fr/artist/458854-Blodwyn-Pig
 Blodwyn Pig On air: http://www.progboard.com/Blodwyn-Pig/On-air-19691989-/8368
 Blodwyn Pig Live at The Filmore West: http://www.progboard.com/Blodwyn-Pig/Live-at-the-Fillmore-West-1970-/8367
 Blodwyn Pig Pigthology: https://www.discogs.com/fr/Blodwyn-Pig-Pigthology/release/6320574
 The Soul Searchers: http://rateyourmusic.com/release/single/the_soul_searchers/scaramouche___head_stand/
 Interview with Jack Lancaster by Dmitry M. Epstein
 Jack Lancaster's discography with album releases & credits at Discogs.com
 A brief history about Jack Lancaster & Robin Lumley and albums The Rock Peter and the Wolf (1975) & Marscape (1976) at Dutch Progressive Net Page (www.DPRP.net)
 

Year of birth missing (living people)
Place of birth missing (living people)
Living people
English rock musicians
RSO Records artists
EMI Records artists
Harvest Records artists
English session musicians
Blodwyn Pig members